This is a list of destroyed heritage of the United States. The year of demolition is marked in parentheses.

This is a list of cultural-heritage sites that have been damaged or destroyed accidentally, deliberately, or by a natural disaster, sorted by state. Only those buildings and structures which fulfill Wikipedia's standards of notability should be included. The simplest test of this is whether the building or structure has its own article page.

Cultural heritage can be subdivided into two main types—tangible and intangible heritage. The former includes built heritage such as religious buildings, museums, monuments, and archaeological sites, as well as movable heritage such as works of art and manuscripts. Intangible cultural heritage includes customs, music, fashion and other traditions within a particular culture. This article mainly deals with the destruction of built heritage; the destruction of movable collectable heritage is dealt with in art destruction, whilst the destruction of movable industrial heritage remains almost totally ignored.

California 
 International Savings & Exchange Bank Building (1954): Demolished by the city government of Los Angeles.
 MGM Silent and Early Sound Film Archive (1965): A fire in one of the studio's archival vaults destroyed the only copies of hundreds of silent and early sound era MGM films.
 Richfield Tower (1969): Demolished to clear site for City National Plaza.
 Wolf House (1913): Jack London's house which burned down before he and his family ever got to move in

Georgia 
 Bonaventure Plantation (1804): fire
 Greenwich Plantation (1923)
 Wetter House (1950)

Illinois 

 Chicago Federal Building (1965)
 Garrick Theater (1961)
 Home Insurance Building (1931): Demolished to clear site for the Field Building.
 Masonic Temple (1939)

Massachusetts 
 Kragsyde (1929)

Michigan 

 Detroit City Hall (1961)
 Franklin H. Walker House (1998)
 J. L. Hudson Department Store and Addition (1998)
 William Livingstone House (2007)

Minnesota 
 Metropolitan Building (1961)

Mississippi 
 Brierfield Plantation (1931): fire

Missouri 
 Kiel Auditorium (1992)

New Jersey 
20th Century Fox Silent Film Archive (1937): A fire in the studio's archival vault destroyed the only prints and original negatives of a majority of silent era films produced by the Fox Film Corporation prior to 1932, as well as the majority of the silent film negatives of Educational Pictures.
 Marlborough-Blenheim Hotel (1978): Demolished to clear site for construction of Bally's Atlantic City.
 Traymore Hotel (1972): Demolished during a downturn in economic fortunes in Atlantic City.
 Ulysses S. Grant Cottage (1963): Demolished by owners.

New Orleans 
 New Orleans Cotton Exchange (1964)

New York 

 Larkin Administration Building, Buffalo (1950)

Ohio 

 Heinrich A. Rattermann House
 Nasby Building

Pennsylvania 
 Broad Street Station (1953)
 Carnegie Building (1952)
 La Ronda (2009)
 Linden Grove (2000)
 Wabash Pittsburgh Terminal (1954)
 Whitemarsh Hall (1980)

Rhode Island 
 Whitehall (1971)

Virginia 
 Abingdon (1930)

Washington, D.C. 
 Raleigh Hotel (1964)
 Wylie Mansion (1947): destroyed partially by fire and then demolished

See also

 Save America's Treasures
 List of destroyed heritage
 List of monuments and memorials removed during the George Floyd protests
 Removal of Confederate monuments and memorials

References 

Heritage
Architecture lists